Sharifabad is a neighborhood in the Karachi Central district of Karachi, Pakistan. It was previously a part of Liaquatabad Town, which was disbanded in 2011.There are several ethnic groups in Sharifabad including Muhajirs, Sindhis, Kashmiris, Seraikis, Pakhtuns, Balochis, Memons, Bohras,  Ismailis, etc. The majority of the residents in Sharifabad are Jodhpuris. Their ancestors migrated from Jodhpur, the second-largest city in the Indian state of Rajasthan.

References

Sharif uddin CHOHAN was the founder of Sharifabad  F B Area karachi

Neighbourhoods of Karachi
Liaquatabad Town
Karachi Central District